U District station is a light rail station on the 1 Line of Sound Transit's Link light rail system in Seattle, Washington, United States. It is located in the University District neighborhood, near the University of Washington campus. The underground station has two entrances along Brooklyn Avenue Northeast at 43rd and 45th streets.

Construction of the station began in 2012 as part of the Northgate Link extension, which was approved by voters in a 2008 ballot measure. It opened on October 2, 2021, along with the rest of the extension. Light rail trains arrive at the station at frequencies of up to eight minutes during peak periods and 10–15 minutes at other times. U District station also includes five bus bays served by several King County Metro and Sound Transit Express routes that connect to nearby areas.

Location

U District station is located under the east side of Brooklyn Avenue Northeast between Northeast 43rd and 45th streets, at the heart of the University District urban village in northern Seattle. It is near the area's main commercial corridor, The Ave, which runs a block east on University Way Northeast. To the west of the station is UW Tower, a high-rise office building used by the University of Washington (UW); adjacent to the station's north entrance is the historic Neptune Theatre. To the east is the university campus as well as the Burke Museum of Natural History and Culture on 15th Avenue Northeast.

Transit-oriented development

The area surrounding U District station is a walkable neighborhood primarily consisting of commercial space and multi-family residential housing.

The rezoning proposal ran into opposition from locals who filed an appeal to halt planning, citing a need for affordable housing and open space. A revised plan unveiled in September 2016 by Mayor Ed Murray requires new developments in the neighborhood to include rent-restricted affordable housing or pay a fine. , there are 20 high-rise buildings under development in the University District, including several above 20 stories in height.

The University of Washington showed interest in developing an office tower over the station box, whose development rights were acquired by the university in 2013. Neighborhood residents and activists, including former UW professor Phil Thiel, instead proposed a public plaza on top of the station, citing the dimensions being similar to those of central squares in European cities. The university approved a 50-year lease with Lincoln Property in 2020 to develop a 12-story office tower above the station site, which is scheduled to begin construction in 2023.

History

Early proposals

Proposals for rapid transit service to the University District date back to the early 20th century. In 1911, Virgil Bogue proposed an extensive rapid transit system, including an underground subway from Downtown Seattle and Eastlake to Latona (the present-day University District), following 10th Avenue Northeast and intersecting an east–west line on Northeast 45th Street. The proposal was rejected by voters the following year. Another proposal in 1920 included a "rapid transit on surface" for Eastlake Avenue, terminating at 14th Avenue NE in the University District; the proposal's recommendation of a subway system was not acted upon by city leaders at the time.

The Forward Thrust plan of the late 1960s proposed building a four-line rapid transit network using $385 million in local funding to augment a larger federal contribution. One of the proposed lines, traveling between Downtown Seattle and Lake City, included a station at 15th Avenue Northeast and Northeast 45th Street adjacent to the Burke Museum. The plan was put before voters on two occasions, in February 1968 and May 1970, and failed to gain the needed supermajority to pass.

In the 1990s, the formation of a regional transit authority (RTA) spurred the planning of a modern light rail system for Seattle. In 1995, the transit authority proposed a regional light rail system to be built by 2010, including an at-grade or underground light rail line through the University District with a station near The Ave. The RTA proposal was rejected by voters in March 1995, citing its $6.7 billion price. A smaller, $3.9 billion plan was approved in November 1996, with the University District as its northern terminus; an extension north to Northgate via Roosevelt was deferred until additional funding could be secured.

Planning

The RTA, re-branded as Sound Transit, selected a preferred route for the light rail line in 1999. The northern terminus was to be located on the east side of 15th Avenue Northeast and Northeast 45th Street, and the line would travel south via a tunnel under Portage Bay towards Downtown Seattle and Rainier Valley, ending at the Seattle–Tacoma International Airport. Cost over-runs and withheld funding from the federal government led Sound Transit to truncate its initial light rail line to Downtown in 2001, with the segment north to the University District to be built at a later date. In 2004, Sound Transit selected a route for tunneled light rail extensions through Capitol Hill and the University District and towards Northgate, using the Montlake Cut and including a station in the vicinity of Brooklyn Avenue NE and NE 45th Street.

Only the southernmost segment of the revised route, from Downtown to Husky Stadium on the south side of the university campus, was funded initially as the "University Link Extension". The northern segment to Northgate was split into a separate project, "North Link", and was included on the 2007 Roads and Transit ballot measure, which was put before voters in November 2007. The combined $18 billion proposal was rejected, with environmentalist groups disavowing it over the roadworks portion that sought to expand regional freeways. A second, transit-only measure known as "Sound Transit 2" was approved by voters in November 2008, securing funding for a light rail extension to Northgate. The North Link project was approved by the Sound Transit Board in June 2012, setting a $2.1 billion budget and expected completion date of 2021.

The 15th Avenue Northeast site for the University District's station was rejected in favor of an option on Brooklyn Avenue. The placement of the Brooklyn station, either on the north or south side of NE 45th Street, was debated by the Sound Transit Board in 2004. Seattle mayor Greg Nickels favored a station on the north side, but other boardmembers sided with community and business groups who wanted a site on the south side. The station site was further complicated the following year by Safeco's decision to expand its headquarters building on the west side of Brooklyn Avenue NE, impacting staging areas that were selected by Sound Transit. Ultimately, Safeco moved its headquarters to a downtown building in 2006, and sold the Brooklyn building to the University of Washington, and the staging areas remained available.

During the planning process, the station was referred to as "Brooklyn", after the street and historic name of the neighborhood. Sound Transit adopted the name "U District" in 2012, after input from public surveys; the abbreviation of "University" was done to avoid re-using the name alongside the University of Washington station at Husky Stadium. The agency also received public comments recommending renaming of the University Street station in Downtown Seattle, to avoid confusion with the stations at U District and University of Washington. University Street station is planned to be renamed to Union Street/Symphony station in 2021 as part of preparations for Northgate Link's opening.

Construction and opening

The contract for tunneling and station construction on the project, since renamed the "Northgate Link extension", was awarded by Sound Transit to JCM Northlink LLC (a joint venture of Jay Dee, Coluccio, and Michels) for $462 million in 2013. In May 2013, demolition of an existing Chase Bank branch and a university-owned property began at the future site of the station. In December, a segment of Brooklyn Avenue NE was closed through the work zone as part of final preparations for the station site. Construction of shoring walls and drilling of pilings in the station box was completed from April to August 2014, leading to the start of excavation the following month. Concrete pouring of the station box began in July 2015, to prepare for the arrival of two tunnel boring machines (TBMs).

The first of the two TBMs to arrive at U District station was "Brenda" on November 6, 2015, completing the northbound tunnel from Northgate via Roosevelt station. "Brenda", since renamed "TBM #1", finished both of the remaining tunnels to University of Washington station in March 2016 and September 2016.

In March 2017, the Sound Transit Board awarded a $159.8 million contract to Hoffman Construction to build U District station, including structural and architectural finishes. Station construction began in August 2017 and is scheduled to last until 2020. A design change approved in October 2018 added a set of stairs between the mezzanine and platform due to escalator issues at other stations. Construction of the station was declared substantially complete in February 2021 and street access on Brooklyn Avenue was restored two months later. Light rail service at the station began on October 2, 2021, and was celebrated with a street fair on Brooklyn Avenue along with live performances and food walk on University Way. The opening of a bus-only lane on Northeast 43rd Street, serving a bus bay at the station's south entrance, was delayed to June 2022 due to the discovery of underground utilities during construction and supply chain issues. Sound Transit estimates that there will be 12,000 daily boardings at the station in 2030.

Station layout

U District station is located on the east side of Brooklyn Avenue Northeast between Northeast 43rd and 45th streets. The underground station has two entrances: the north entrance (Exit A) near 45th and adjacent to the Neptune Theatre; and the south entrance (Exit B) at the intersection of Brooklyn and 43rd. The entrances are identified from street level by two accent colors (orange for the north, teal for the south) and large graphics with the station name. Both entrances have ticket vending machines, elevators to the platforms, and both stairs and escalators leading to the mezzanine level. The south entrance also has 52 bicycle storage spaces in a covered cage with a bicycle pump, while the north entrance has bicycle racks and lockers.

The station was designed by LMN Architects, a Seattle-based firm that also designed the University of Washington station. It occupies  and spans five floors, of which four are underground. Public art is integrated into the station's design as part of the "STart" program, which allocates a percentage of project construction funds to art projects to be used in stations. Lead Pencil Studio was commissioned to create Fragment Brooklyn, a platform-level installation at the station that covers the west wall with depictions of architectural features. The piece, which drew inspiration from buildings in the University District and Brooklyn, New York, primarily uses hammered aluminum for the fixtures, which includes windows with screens that display 18 hours of looping videos, fire escapes, and rooflines.

Services

The station is served by the 1 Line, which runs between Northgate, Downtown Seattle, the Rainier Valley, and Seattle–Tacoma International Airport. U District station is the second southbound station from Northgate and sixteenth northbound station from Angle Lake, the line's northern and southern termini, respectively. It is situated between Roosevelt and University of  Washington stations. 1 Line trains serve U District station twenty hours a day on weekdays and Saturdays, from 5:00 a.m. to 1:00 a.m.; and eighteen hours on Sundays, from 6:00 a.m. to midnight. During regular weekday service, trains operate roughly every eight to ten minutes during rush hour and midday operation, respectively, with longer headways of fifteen minutes in the early morning and twenty minutes at night. During weekends, 1 Line trains arrive at U District station every ten minutes during midday hours and every fifteen minutes during mornings and evenings. The station is approximately five minutes from Northgate station, eight minutes from Westlake station in Downtown Seattle, and 44 minutes from SeaTac/Airport station.

U District station is also served by several King County Metro and Sound Transit Express buses that provide onward connections to surrounding neighborhoods and regional destinations. The station has five bus bays, primarily on Northeast 45th Street and University Way, and an additional stop on 15th Avenue Northeast for regional routes. King County Metro operates fifteen routes from U District station with connections to Ballard, Fremont, Green Lake, Roosevelt, Lake City, Sand Point, Montlake, the Central District, Capitol Hill, Downtown Seattle, Magnolia, Renton, Bellevue, and Issaquah. The area's three Sound Transit Express routes connect the station to Redmond, Bellevue, Issaquah, Federal Way, and Tacoma. Metro's RapidRide J Line, planned to open in 2026, will begin at the station and connect to Eastlake and South Lake Union.

References

External links

Sound Transit Rider Guide

Link light rail stations in Seattle
Railway stations located underground in Seattle
Railway stations in the United States opened in 2021
Railway stations in Washington (state) at university and college campuses
2021 establishments in Washington (state)